Portage Lake Water Aerodrome  is located  southwest of Portage Lake, Ontario, Canada.

References

Registered aerodromes in Ontario
Seaplane bases in Ontario